German submarine U-247 was a Type VIIC U-boat of Nazi Germany's Kriegsmarine during World War II. The submarine was laid down on 16 December 1942 at the Friedrich Krupp Germaniawerft yard at Kiel as yard number 681, launched on 23 September 1943 and commissioned on 23 October under the command of Oberleutnant zur See Gerhard Matschulat.

In two patrols, she sank one ship of 207 GRT.

She was sunk by Canadian warships on 1 September 1944.

Design
German Type VIIC submarines were preceded by the shorter Type VIIB submarines. U-247 had a displacement of  when at the surface and  while submerged. She had two shafts and two  propellers.

U-247 was fitted with five  torpedo tubes (four fitted at the bow and one at the stern), fourteen torpedoes, one  SK C/35 naval gun, (220 rounds), one  Flak M42 and two twin  C/30 anti-aircraft guns. The boat had a complement of between forty-four and sixty.

Service history
After training with the 5th U-boat Flotilla at Kiel, U-247 was transferred to the 1st flotilla for front-line service on 23 October 1943.

First patrol
The boat's first patrol was preceded by a short trip between Kiel in Germany, and Arendal and Bergen in Norway. Her first sortie began with her departure from Bergen on 31 May 1944. She passed into the Atlantic Ocean via the gap between the Faroe and Shetland Islands. She sank the Noreen Mary on 5 July west of Scotland, with gunfire, not torpedoes, which was quite remarkable by this stage of the war, with a near constant Allied air presence so close to the British coast. It is alleged that her crew then machine-gunned survivors of the fishing boat in the water, only one of two cases believed to have substance to the claim (see also ). She then skirted to the west of Ireland, before arriving at Brest in occupied France, on 27 July.

Second patrol and loss
The boat had left Brest on 26 August 1944. Fifty-two men died; there were no survivors.

Summary of raiding history

References

Bibliography

Further reading

External links

German Type VIIC submarines
World War II submarines of Germany
World War II shipwrecks in the English Channel
U-boats commissioned in 1943
U-boats sunk in 1944
U-boats sunk by Canadian warships
U-boats sunk by depth charges
1943 ships
Ships built in Kiel
Ships lost with all hands
Maritime incidents in September 1944
Nazi war crimes